Rafael Yglesias is an American novelist and screenwriter best known for his novels, Hide Fox, And All After, A Happy Marriage, and the 1993 movie Fearless, which he adapted from his own novel of the same name. He is the father of Nicholas and Matthew Yglesias.

Career
Yglesias was born in New York in 1954, son of novelist and journalist Jose Yglesias, and author Helen Yglesias. He began writing screenplays in 1980. Fearless, directed by Peter Weir and starring Jeff Bridges, was critically acclaimed and led to Rosie Perez being nominated for an Academy Award for Best Supporting Actress for her role as Carla Rodrigo. The film was also entered into the 44th Berlin International Film Festival. Jeff Bridges' role as Max Klein is widely regarded as one of the best performances of his career. Yglesias' other screenplays include Death and the Maiden, directed by Roman Polanski and based on the play by Ariel Dorfman; Les Misérables, directed by Bille August and based on the novel by Victor Hugo, and From Hell, directed by the Hughes Brothers and based on the graphic novel by Alan Moore and Eddie Campbell.  His film Dark Water is a remake of a J-horror film of the same name and was directed by Walter Salles.

Yglesias turned to television writing in the mid-2000s when, with screenwriter Tom Schulman, he adapted The Anatomy of Hope, a nonfiction book by Jerome Groopman about the psychological experience of illness, for HBO. The pilot was directed by J. J. Abrams but the network declined to move forward with a full series order.

From 2014 to 2016, Yglesias worked on Aquarius, created by John McNamara and starring David Duchovny, ultimately writing five episodes of the two-season series.

Novels
 Hide Fox, and All After
 The Work Is Innocent
 The Game Player
 Hot Properties
 Only Children
 The Murderer Next Door
 Fearless
 Dr. Neruda's Cure for Evil
 A Happy Marriage
 The Wisdom of Perversity
 Fabulous at Fifty

References

External links
Essay on Working With Polanski
Author's website

Living people
20th-century American novelists
American people of Cuban descent
American people of Galician descent
People from Washington Heights, Manhattan
American male screenwriters
Horace Mann School alumni
American people of Polish-Jewish descent
21st-century American novelists
American male novelists
20th-century American male writers
21st-century American male writers
Novelists from New York (state)
Screenwriters from New York (state)
Year of birth missing (living people)